The 10th Canadian Comedy Awards, presented by the Canadian Comedy Foundation for Excellence (CCFE), honoured the best live, television, film, and Internet comedy of 2008.  The ceremony was held at the Imperial Theatre in Saint John, New Brunswick on 2 October 2009 and was hosted by Seán Cullen.

Canadian Comedy Awards, also known as Beavers, were awarded in 22 categories. Some winners were picked by members of industry organizations, while others were chosen by the Canadian public through an online poll.  The awards ceremony was held during the four-day Canadian Comedy Awards Festival which showcased performances by over 100 comic artists.  A Best of the Fest special was broadcast by The Comedy Network.

The film Young People Fucking led with eight nominations followed by This Hour Has 22 Minutes with five Ron Sparks with two.  Young People Fucking won three Beavers, followed by Ron Sparks, The Jon Dore Television Show and Less Than Kind with two wins each.

Festival and ceremony

The 10th Canadian Comedy Awards and Festival ran from 1 to 4 October 2009 in Saint John, New Brunswick. The festival included numerous shows and workshops.

The awards ceremony was held on 2 October 2009 at the Imperial Theatre, hosted by Seán Cullen. The Last Laugh Gala was held the following night at the same venue; both events were taped by sponsor The Comedy Network for later broadcast.

Related events

On 5 August 2009, two months before the festival, the show Canadian Comedy Award Nominees vs. Cancer was held at The Rivoli in Toronto, Ontario. The show was a pay-what-you-can fundraiser for the Canadian Cancer Society.

The Canadian Comedy Awards 10th Anniversary Special was taped at Toronto's Masonic Temple in the fall of 2009.  Samantha Bee and Jason Jones hosted the show, though when they had first agreed to do so they thought it was for the awards ceremony.  Instead, it was a showcase of Beaver-winning comedians from the past decade.  It was broadcast by The Comedy Network on 15 May 2010.

When the festival came to New Brunswick, James Mullinger and Lloyd Ravn stayed to build a comedy scene in the province.  Seven years later Mullinger staged the show Every Comedian in New Brunswick featuring 42 local comics. Shane Ogden, who won the Funniest Person in New Brunswick contest as part of the CCAF, is also credited with bringing stand-up comedy to the province, and opened the first comedy club in Saint John in 2015.

Winners and nominees
The multimedia, Internet and Canadian Comedy Person of the Year awards had been decided by public vote through an online poll. Winners in the 19 other categories had been decided through votes from industry members.  Voting took place during July 2009.

Winners are listed first and highlighted in boldface:

Multimedia

Live

Television

Film

Internet

Special Awards

Multiple wins
The following people, shows, films, etc. received multiple awards

Multiple nominations
The following people, shows, films, etc. received multiple nominations

References

External links
Canadian Comedy Awards official website

Canadian Comedy Awards
Canadian Comedy Awards
Awards
Awards